Karrar Amer (born 16 October 1994) is an Iraqi footballer who plays as a centre-back for Al-Shorta in the Iraqi Premier League.

International career
On 23 September 2022, Amer made his first international cap with Iraq against Oman in the 2022 Jordan International Tournament.

Honours

Club
Al-Shorta
Iraqi Premier League: 2021–22
Iraqi Super Cup: 2022

References

External links 
 

1994 births
Living people
Iraqi footballers
Iraq international footballers
Al-Mina'a SC players
Al-Shorta SC players
Association football defenders